The following is a list of state highways in Kentucky with numbers between 6000 and 6999.

6000–6999
KY 6000 
KY 6001 
KY 6002 
KY 6003 - from US 421 near Jett to Bon Air Hills (established 2014; original route in Livingston County removed 1989)
KY 6004 
KY 6005 - from KY 917 to near Grand Rivers
KY 6006   
KY 6007 (removed 1995)
KY 6008   
KY 6009 (established 2021; original route replaced by KY 810 in 1987)
KY 6010  
KY 6011  
KY 6012    
KY 6013 (removed 1987)
KY 6014  (established 2010; original route in Lyon County became part of KY 6013 in 1987 for a month before being removed entirely)
KY 6015 (removed 1987)
 KY 6016  
 KY 6017  
 KY 6018 - from KY 6019 near Confederate to near Greenacres 
KY 6019  
KY 6020  
KY 6021  
KY 6022 
KY 6023 (renumbered KY 6060 in 1986)
KY 6024 (became part of KY 3305 in 1987)
KY 6025   
KY 6026 (became part of KY 6025 in 2014)
KY 6027  
KY 6028  
KY 6029  
KY 6030 - from KY 6032 in Hendron to KY 994 in Hendron 
KY 6031  
KY 6032  
KY 6033  
KY 6034 - from KY 6034 near Hovekamp to near Hendron 
KY 6035 - from near Hendron to Hovekamp  
KY 6036 - from near Hovekamp to KY 6039 near Hovekamp 
KY 6037  
KY 6038  
KY 6039  
KY 6040 - from Hovekamp to KY 2187 in Farley
KY 6041 - from Hendron to US 45 in Massac
KY 6042 - from Massac to KY 1241 near Lone Oak
KY 6043 
KY 6044 (replaced by KY 795 in 1987)
KY 6045 
KY 6046 (established 2022; original route replaced by KY 1413 in 1987) 
KY 6047 (replaced by KY 3456 in 1997)
KY 6048 
KY 6049 
KY 6050 
KY 6051 
KY 6052 
KY 6053 
KY 6054 
KY 6055 (removed 1988)
KY 6056 
KY 6057 - from near Caledonia to KY 6058 near Montgomery
KY 6058 
KY 6059
KY 6060 - from near Lamasco to KY 139 near Hopson
KY 6061 (removed 2006)
KY 6062 - from Olive Hill to KY 3298 near Counts Crossroads (established 2012; original route in Christian County replaced by KY 1881)
KY 6063 (established 2012; original route in Christian County removed 1989)
KY 6064 (removed 1989)
KY 6065 (removed 1989)
KY 6066 (removed 1989)
KY 6067 (removed 2006)
KY 6068 (removed 1989)
KY 6069 (removed 1989)
KY 6070 (removed 1989)
KY 6071 (removed 1989)
KY 6072 (removed 1989)
KY 6073 (removed 1989)
  KY 6074 - from near Crowell Landing to US 60 in Ledbetter (established 2013; original route in Christian County removed 1989)
KY 6075 (removed 1989)
KY 6076 (removed 1989)
KY 6077 (removed 2015)
KY 6078 (removed 2009)
KY 6079 (removed 2009)
KY 6080 (removed 2009)
  KY 6081
KY 6082 (removed 2009)
KY 6083 (removed 2009)
KY 6084 (removed 2009)
KY 6085 (removed 2009)
KY 6086 (removed 2009)
  KY 6087 
KY 6088 (removed 2009)
KY 6089 (removed 2009)
KY 6090 (removed 2009)
KY 6091 (replaced by KY 3143 in 1987)
KY 6092 (replaced by KY 3335 in 1987)
KY 6093 (removed 2016)
KY 6094 (removed 2016)
KY 6095 (removed 2016)
KY 6096 (removed 2016)
KY 6097 (removed 2016)
KY 6098 
KY 6099 (removed 2016)
KY 6100 (removed 2016)
KY 6101 (removed 2006)
KY 6102 (removed 2016)
KY 6103 (removed 2016)
KY 6104 (removed 2016?)
KY 6105 (removed 2000)
KY 6106 (removed 2016)
KY 6107 - from KY 812 in Henderson to near Graham Hill
KY 6108 (replaced by KY 2247 in 1987)
KY 6109 (replaced by KY 2249 in 1987)
KY 6110
KY 6111
KY 6112 (removed 2008)
KY 6113
 KY 6114 - from US 62 in Powderly to  Central City
KY 6115 (removed 2002)
 KY 6116
  KY 6117
KY 6118 (removed 2014)
KY 6119 (removed 2011)
KY 6120 (removed 1988)
  KY 6121 (removed 2020)
  KY 6122
  KY 6123
KY 6124 - from KY 6123 near Beda to near Hartford
KY 6125 (removed 2000)
KY 6126 (removed 2014)
KY 6127 (removed 2011)
KY 6128 (removed 1994)
KY 6129 (removed 1997)
KY 6130 (established 2009; original route in Barren County removed 1994)
KY 6131 (removed 1994)
KY 6132 (removed 1994)
KY 6133 (removed 1992)
KY 6134 (removed 1994)
KY 6135 (removed 1994)
KY 6136 (removed 1986)
KY 6137 (removed 1986)
KY 6138 (removed 2011)
KY 6139 - from near Rockland to KY 626 near Hadley
 KY 6140
KY 6141 - from US 68 near Bowling Green to near Memphis Junction
KY 6142
KY 6143
KY 6144
KY 6145
 KY 6146
 KY 6147
 KY 6148
KY 6149 (removed 1991)
KY 6150 (removed 1991)
KY 6151 (removed 1991)
KY 6152 (removed 1991)
KY 6153 (removed 1991)
KY 6154 (removed 1991)
KY 6155 (removed 1991)
KY 6156 (removed 1994)
KY 6157 (removed 1994)
 KY 6158
  KY 6159
 KY 6160 
  KY 6161
 KY 6162
  KY 6163 - from KY 1399 near Veechdale to near Lincoln Ridge (established 1994; original route in Boone County removed 1987)
KY 6164 (removed 1987)
KY 6165 (removed 1987)
KY 6166 (removed 1995)
KY 6167 (removed 1994)
KY 6168 (removed 2018)
KY 6169 (removed 2002)
KY 6170 (removed 2002)
KY 6171 - from near Paynes Depot to near Lancelot Estates
KY 6172
KY 6173 (removed 2020)
KY 6174 (removed 1993)
KY 6175 (removed 1993)
KY 6176 (removed 2009)
  KY 6177
KY 6178 (removed 2020)
KY 6179 (removed 2020)
KY 6180 (removed 2020)
KY 6181 (removed 2020)
KY 6182 (removed 2020)
KY 6183 (removed 2020)
KY 6184 (removed 1993)
KY 6185 (removed 1993)
KY 6186 (removed 1997)
KY 6187 (removed 1997)
KY 6188 (removed 1997)
KY 6189 (removed 1997)
KY 6190 (removed 1997)
KY 6191 (replaced by KY 3262 in 1987)
KY 6192 (removed 1997)
KY 6193 (removed 1997)
KY 6194 (replaced by KY 3172 in 1997)
KY 6195 (removed 1997)
KY 6196
KY 6197 (removed 1997)
KY 6198 (removed 1997)
KY 6199 (removed 1997)
KY 6200 (replaced by KY 3261 in 1997)
KY 6201 (removed 1997)
KY 6202 (removed 1991)
KY 6203 (removed 1991)
KY 6204 (removed 1991)
KY 6205 (removed 1991)
KY 6206 (removed 1991)
KY 6207 (removed 1991)
KY 6208 (removed 1991)
KY 6209 (removed 1991)
KY 6210 (removed 1991)
KY 6211 (removed 1991)
KY 6212 (removed 1991)
KY 6213 (removed 1991)
KY 6214 (removed 1991)
KY 6215 (removed 1991)
KY 6216 (removed 1991)
KY 6217
KY 6218
KY 6219
KY 6220
KY 6221 (first route renumbered KY 6232 in 1994; second route in Jefferson County removed)
KY 6222
KY 6223
KY 6224 (removed 2000)
KY 6225
KY 6226
KY 6227
KY 6228
KY 6229 (removed 2010)
KY 6230
KY 6231 - from near Stinson to near Pactolus
KY 6232 - from near Norton Branch to near Coalton (established 1994)
KY 6233
KY 6234 (removed 2022)
KY 6235 (removed 1995)
KY 6236 (removed 1995)
KY 6237 (removed 2003)
KY 6238
KY 6239
KY 6240 (removed 1992)
KY 6241 (removed 1992)
KY 6242 (removed 1992)
KY 6243 (removed 1992)
KY 6244 (removed 1992)
KY 6245 (removed 1992)
KY 6246 (removed 1992)
KY 6247 (removed 1992)
KY 6248 (removed 1992)
KY 6249 (removed 1992)
KY 6250 (removed 1992)
KY 6251 (removed 1992)
KY 6252 (removed 1992)
KY 6253 (removed 1992)
KY 6254 (removed 1992)
KY 6255 (removed 1992)
KY 6256
KY 6257
KY 6258
KY 6259 - from KY 80 in London to US 25
KY 6260 - from Hal Rogers Parkway in London to near Pittsburg
KY 6261
KY 6262 (removed 2012)
KY 6263
KY 6264
KY 6265 (removed 2017)
KY 6266 - from near Brock to near Laurel River (neighborhood)
KY 6267 - from near Brock to KY 6268 near Laurel River (neighborhood)
KY 6268
KY 6269
KY 6270
KY 6271 (replaced by KY 3428 in 1987)
KY 6272
KY 6273 (replaced by KY 3424 in 1988)
KY 6274
KY 6275
KY 6276
KY 6277 (replaced by KY 3424 in 1987)
KY 6278 (replaced by KY 3424 in 1987)
 KY 6279
KY 6280 (replaced by KY 3424 in 1987)
KY 6281 (replaced by KY 3425 in 1987)
KY 6282 (replaced by KY 3425 in 1987)
KY 6283 (removed 1990)
KY 6284 (removed 1990)
KY 6285 (removed 1990)
KY 6286 (removed 1990)
KY 6287 (removed 1990)
KY 6288 (removed 1990)
KY 6289 (removed 2007)
KY 6290 (removed 1990)
 KY 6291
 KY 6292
KY 6293 (removed 2009)
 KY 6294
 KY 6295
KY 6296 (removed 2001)
KY 6297 (removed 1999)
 KY 6298 - from KY 6299 near Louisville to near Smyrna (Louisville)
 KY 6299 - from KY 6298 near Louisville to KY 61 near Louisville
KY 6300 (removed 1999)
 KY 6301 (original route (old KY 61 in Pioneer Village) removed 1988)
 KY 6302 - from KY 61 in Hillview to near Louisville
 KY 6303 - from KY 61 near Hillview to Zoneton
 KY 6304 - from KY 61 near Louisville to KY 6299 near Louisville
 KY 6305
 KY 6306
 KY 6307
KY 6308 (removed 1989)
KY 6309 (removed 2009)
KY 6310 (removed 2010)
KY 6311 (removed 2008)
KY 6312 (removed 1989)
 KY 6313 - from KY 61 near Fox Chase to KY 6314 near Pioneer Village (established 2011; original route in Simpson County removed 1989)
 KY 6314 (established 2011; original route in Simpson County removed 1989)
KY 6315 (removed 1989)
  KY 6316- from Bowling Green to US 231 near Springhill
 KY 6317
 KY 6318
 KY 6319
 KY 6320
KY 6321 (removed 1993)
 KY 6322
 KY 6323
 KY 6324
 KY 6325 (removed 2022)
 KY 6326
 KY 6327
 KY 6328
 KY 6329
KY 6330
 KY 6331
 KY 6332 - from US 60 in Louisville to near Fairdale
KY 6333 (removed 1993)
 KY 6334
  KY 6335 - from Bus. KY 8 in Dayton to KY 445 in Ft. Thomas

6000-6999
State highways (6000-6999)